Skoczkowo may refer to the following places in Poland:

Skoczkowo, Masovian Voivodeship
Skoczkowo, Pomeranian Voivodeship